Jeunesse Sportive de Kabylie (in , in Kabyle: Ilemẓiyen inaddalen n leqbayel, In Tamazight: ⵉⵍⵎⵣⵢⵏ ⵉⵏⴰⴷⴰⵍⴻⵏ ⵏ ⵍⵇⵠⴰⵢⵍ), known as JS Kabylie or JSK, is an Algerian professional football club based in Tizi Ouzou. The club is named after the cultural, natural and historical region that is home to the Kabyle Berber people speaking Kabyle (the letters ⵊ ⵙ ⴽ on the badge are Tifinagh letters for JSK). The club was founded in 1946 and its colours are yellow and green. Their home stadium, New Stadium of Tizi Ouzou, has a capacity of 50,766 spectators. The club is currently playing in the Algerian Ligue Professionnelle 1. It is the most successful football club in Algeria.

JS Kabylie has won the Algerian Ligue Professionnelle 1 title 14 times, the Algerian Cup 5 times, the Algerian League Cup once and the Algerian Super Cup once. The club has also won a number of African titles, including the CAF Champions League twice, the African Cup Winners' Cup once and the CAF Cup three times.

History
On 2 August 1946, the club was officially founded with name of Jeunesse Sportive de Kabylie, and began competing in the Third Division League Football Association of Algiers. They played their first official match on 13 October 1946 in the Seven Division.

In 1947–48, the club won the championship group, finishing first in their pool and therefore were promoted to first division. The first season in 1st division of Algiers ended with a second-place finish.

They won their first league title in the 1972-1973 season.

They won their first Algerian Cup in 1977 as JS Kawkabi, defeating NA Hussein Dey 2–1.

In 1982, Jeunesse sportive de Kabylie, winner of African Cup of Champions Clubs, won the first African Super Cup trophy against the winner of the African Cup of Cup Winners, Union Douala, by a penalty shoot-out (4–3) after score of 1–1 in Abidjan.

They won Algerian league on seven occasions between 1979/80 and 1989/90, when they were known as JE Tizi-Ouzou.

They won African Champions Cup in 1981 and 1990.

Following their fourth Algerian Cup success in 1994, in 1995 they won African Cup Winners' Cup.

In 2000, 2001 and 2002 they won CAF Cup three times in the row.

In 2004 and 2006 they won the league title.

In 2007–08, they won the league title.

In 2011, they won an Algerian Cup.

They won the Algerian League Cup in 2021.

Rivalries
JSK has a rivalry with USM Alger (the Algerian clasico), MC Alger and MC Oran.

Their matches with JSM Bejaia and MO Bejaia are known as the Derby of Kabylia.

USM Alger

The game between JS Kabylie and USM Alger is one of the most important games in the Algerian League. This rivalry has been full excitement, anger and conflicts from 1995, and peaked between 2001 and 2006 when the two teams dominated The Algerian Football.

Honours

Domestic competitions
Algerian Ligue Professionnelle 1
Champions (14) (record): 1972–73, 1973–74, 1976–77, 1979–80, 1981–82, 1982–83, 1984–85, 1985–86, 1988–89, 1989–90, 1994–95, 2003–04, 2005–06, 2007–08
Runner-up (12): 1977–78, 1978–79, 1980–81, 1987–88, 1998–99, 2001–02, 2004–05, 2006–07, 2008–09, 2013–14, 2018–19 , 2021–22

Algerian Cup
Winners (5): 1976–77, 1985–86, 1991–92, 1993–94, 2010–11
Runners-up (6): 1978–79, 1990–91, 1998–99, 2003–04, 2013–14, 2017–18

Algerian League Cup
Winners (1): 2021

Algerian Super Cup
Winners (1): 1992
Runners-up (3): 1994, 1995, 2006

International competitions
African Champions Cup
Winners (2): 1981, 1990

African Cup Winners' Cup
Winners (1): 1995

CAF Cup
Winners (3) (record): 2000, 2001, 2002
CAF Confederation Cup
Runners-up (1): 2020–21
CAF Super Cup
Runners-up (1): 1996

Tournament of Fraternity (Ivory Cost) 
Winners (1): 1982

Tripartite tournament of Dakar (Senegal)
Winners (1): 1985

Maghreb Champions club (Algeria) 
Runners-up (1): 1974

Statistics

Players with most appearances in officials competitions

Players with most goals in officials competitions

Players with most titles in officials competitions

Sporting result

Results of JS Kabylie in competitions during the colonial period from 13 October 1946 to 11 March 1956 

The JSK, officially created in 1946, entered the competition in the Third Division and played its first official match on 13. Affiliated to both the French Football Association and the Algiers Football Association League, it participated in all possible competitions in Algeria governed by these two organizations. The JSK won only one title during this period, it is a title of champion of the Second Division acquired at the end of the 1949–1950 season. An unofficial title of Premier Division champion also appears in its record when the team reached the Honorary Promotion Division. Finally the JSK will play its last match on 11 March 1956 and will cease all its activities following the appeal of the FLN.

Records

The club had many records in Algeria, in Africa and in the World.
 Best Algerian club in the twentieth century.
 The CAF classify the club on one on the best ten club in Africa on the twenty century.
 The club is ranking 7th club in Africa during the decade (2001–2011) by the IFFHS and also among the top ten of all time.
 The club is the only Algerian club that has never been relegated to the second division. He has 54 seasons in the row in top level.
 In Algeria, the club is the most successful club in African cup with 7 African titles in 9 finals played.
 In Africa, the club is the 7th most successful club.
 JSK is the second Algerian club to have won the CAF Champions League.
 JSK is the first Algerian club to have won the CAF Champions League twice.
 JSK have never lost in the final of the CAF Champions League.
 JSK participated four times in a row to the Algerian Super Cup final in 1992, 1994, 1995 and in 2006.
 JSK is the first Algerian club to achieve twice the double CAF Champions League – Championship, in 1981 and 1990.
 JSK twice achieved the double Algerian Cup – Championship in 1977 and 1986.
 JSK won twice in a row the Algerian Cup in 1992 and 1994 (the 1993 edition was not played).
 JSK holds the record for Algerian League Cup with a title tied with MC Oran, MC Alger and CR Belouizdad.
 JSK is the only Algerian club to have won the African Cup Winners' Cup.
 JSK is the only Algerian club to win the CAF Cup / CAF Confederation Cup.
 JSK holds two other African records: it won the CAF Cup three times and consecutively in 2000, 2001 and 2002.
 JSK is the first club in the world to win the Continental C3 three times in a row.
 The JSK is part of the very closed circle of clubs having won the three African competitions: the CAF Champions League, the African Cup Winners' Cup and the CAF Cup / CAF Confederation Cup, a record shared with Esperance de Tunis, Etoile Sportive du Sahel, Al Ahly, Zamalek and TP Mazembe.
 JSK is the Algerian club which has played the most African games (201 games) including (110 games) in the CAF Champions League as well as the club with the most of participation in African Cups (30 times).
 The JSK is the Algerian club which has played the most national and continental finals in all competitions: 9 African finals, one Maghrebian final, 11 final in the Algerian Cup, five final in the Algerian Super Cup, one final in the Algerian championship and a final in the Algerian League Cup (28 in total).
 JSK is the first Algerian and African club to have won the African Super Cup at a tournament in Abidjan in 1982 and also the first club in Algeria to win the Algerian Super Cup in 1973.
 JSK is the most successful club in the Algerian league (14 titles).
 JSK is the second Algerian club which has played the most final in the Algerian Cup (11 finals).
 At the end of the season 2021–2022, JSK is the club with the most wins in the league (741 victories) in 53 seasons, having scored the most goals (2127 goals) and the third club having played the most top-flight matches (1619 games).
 JSK holds the record for the greatest goal difference in a season with 89 goals scored for 22 goals conceded (+67) during the season 1985–1986 (38 fixtures).
 JSK achieved the best defense in its history during the 1997–1998 with only 11 goals conceded in a 14 fixtures.
 The JSK also holds the record for the greatest number of league victories: 27 victories in 38 games during the season 1985–1986.
 The JSK jointly hold the record for the largest victory in the league with a score of 11–0, against JHD Algiers, achieved during the season 1985–1986.
 JSK also holds the record for the greatest number of doubles in the Algerian league with four doubles.
 JSK holds the record for the most podiums with 32 podiums.
 Nacer Bouiche is the Algerian golden shoe, the most prolific in the history of the championship, with a record of 36 goals scored during the 1985–1986 (38 fixtures) with the club.
 The JSK also has the record for the greatest number of Algerian golden shoes: 12 in total.
 JSK is part of the very closed circle of clubs which have never known relegation to the second division in the world since its accession to the first division.

Players
Most of the team players are Algerians, as the Algerian teams are limited to two foreign players. The squad list includes only the principal nationality of each player.

Current squad
As of 5 February 2023.

Reserve Squad

Personnel

Current technical staff

Management

Club personalities

Presidents 
JSK is the most stable club in Algeria. It has only known 19 presidents since its creation in 1946.
The president who has been the club president the shortest is Mouloud Iboud for a period of three months. The longest presidency of the JSK is that of Mohand Chérif Hannachi who was in office for 24 years.

The most successful president is Boussad Benkaci with 14 titles in 15 years.

No activity between 1956 and 1962 due to the Algerian war.

The presidents who have succeeded at its head are:

Coaches 

From Ali Benslama in 1946 to Miloud Hamdi, 80 changes of trainers have taken place. They involved 71 different people and the club has known no less than 18 coaching duos during its history. Some coaches have been at the head of JS Kabylie several times, such as Abderrahmane Boubekeur and Mahieddine Khalef. During this period, a coach stays in place for an average of one year and four months, or just over a championship season. The instability in this position is particularly strong during the period 1965-1977 since the club knows 15 changes of coaches during this period, which is equivalent to a different coach every seven and a half months. The arrival of the duo Mahieddine Khalef and Stefan Zywotko at the technical bar of the JSK for 13 seasons (from 1977 to 1990) stops this instability. However, after the departure of this duo, the JSK knows again a new waltz of coaches, which lasts until today, like the 29 coaches or duo of coaches that the club had between 1989 and 2011, or a trainer every nine months or so.

Mahieddine Khalef is the most successful Algerian and JSK coaches (13 titles), with eight Algerian championship titles (1977, 1980, 1982, 1983, 1985, 1986, 1989 and 1990), two Algerian Cup ( 1977 and 1986), an African Cup of Champions Clubs in 1981 as well as a CAF Supercup in 1982. He also won the CAF Cup in 2001 with Nasser Sendjak.

The Khalef - Zywotko duo is the most successful technical staff (9 titles) with the JSK since they won the Algerian championships 1980, 1982, 1983, 1985, 1986, 1989 as well as the Algerian Cup in 1986, the African Cup of Champion Clubs in 1981 and the CAF Supercup in 1982. This duo is considered “legendary” in the ranks of JSK79 supporters. Other coaches brought titles to the club: the JSK thus won the CAF Cup under the orders of the Sendjak-Khalef duo (who replaced Nadjmeddine Belayachi just before the final of 2000), Kamel Mouassa, and Jean-Yves Chay in 2000, 2001 and 2002 respectively. Djamel Menad, while being at the same time assistant coach of Djaâfar Harouni and player, allows the club to win the African Cup winners' Cup in 1995 and the championship. After nine years without a title of champion (longest period of famine in the history of the club), the JSK won the title of champion of Algeria under the leadership of Azzedine Aït Djoudi in 2004.

After ten years without a title, the JSK won the Algerian League Cup in 2021 under the direction of Denis Lavagne and added a new line to its list.

Among the coaches of the JSK, there are 30 foreign technicians who are twelve French, four Romanians, three Tunisians, three Belgians, two Hungarians, a Polish, a Yugoslav, a Swiss, a Brazilian, a Bulgarian and an Italian.

The longevity record is attributed to Stefan Zywotko (1977- December 1991, 14 years and 6 months).

Unless otherwise indicated, the periods indicated in the following table begin and end respectively at the start and end of the season.

No activity between 1956 and 1962 due to the Algerian war.

Iconic players 

Some players have contributed to the great successes of this team, and a few have become legends for fans of the "canaries". Here are some big names of football players who have worn the colors of the JSK.

Salah Larbes, with more 500 games played, is the player who has worn the JS Kabylie jersey the most times.

  means winner of African Games football, being a JSK player.
  means winner of the Africa Cup of Nations, being a JSK player
  means winner of Mediterranean Games football, being a JSK player.

Captains of JS Kabylie 
To date, there have been 35 captains who have succeeded at the head of the club.
No activity between 1956 and 1962 due to the Algerian war.

Individual trophies

Notes

References

External links

 

 
Football clubs in Algeria
Association football clubs established in 1946
Kabylie
Algerian Ligue Professionnelle 1 clubs
Tizi Ouzou Province
1946 establishments in Algeria
CAF Champions League winning clubs
CAF Cup winning clubs
African Cup Winners Cup winning clubs